The American Guild of Organists (AGO) is an international organization of academic, church, and concert organists in the US, headquartered in New York City with its administrative offices in the Interchurch Center. Founded as a professional educational association, it was chartered by the Board of Regents of the University of the State of New York in 1896, with the authority to grant certificates of associate or fellow to members who passed examinations.

Membership is not limited to professional organists, but is open to anybody with an interest in organs and organ music.  As of 2020, there are approximately 14,000 voting members in all categories of membership. The AGO's current president is Eileen Hunt, elected in 2022.

The guild seeks to set and maintain high musical standards and to promote understanding and appreciation of all aspects of organ and choral music.

Founders
Among the 145 founding members of the guild were Benjamin Dwight Allen, John W. Bischoff, Dudley Buck, George Whitefield Chadwick, Kate Sara Chittenden, Charles Whitney Coombs, Gaston Dethier, Clarence Dickinson, Clarence Eddy, Mary Chappell Fisher, Arthur Foote, William Gilchrist, Henry Houseley Henry Holden Huss, Bruno Klein, Ernst R. Kroeger, Benjamin Johnson Lang, Peter C. Lutkin,  Charlotte Wells Saenger, Fannie Morris Spencer, and Herve D. Wilkins. Clifford Demarest also played an important role in its first two decades.

Organization
The American Guild of Organists is geographically divided into seven regions and 298 chapters. The AGO has chapters in Australia (Sydney), Barbados, Hong Kong, Kenya (Nairobi), Finland (Helsinki), Singapore, Shanghai, and Taiwan. The European chapter is the oldest chapter outside of the US, with many members in France and Germany, as well as other countries.

The leadership of the AGO consists of a National Council, seven regional councillors forming a Board of Regional Councillors, and various local chapters within each region.  The national headquarters is located at 475 Riverside Drive, Suite 1260, in New York, New York, in the Interchurch Center.

The National Council is the governing body of the American Guild of Organists. The four national officers, five national councillors with committees in portfolio, and the chair of the board of regional councillors (selected by the seven regional councillors from among their number) are members of the National Council. The executive director is a non-voting member of the National Council.  The chaplain is an honorary member of the National Council.

The national officers of the guild consist of a president, a vice president/councillor of competitions and new music, a secretary/councillor for communications, and a treasurer/councillor for finance and development.  National councillors coordinate and represent to the National Council specific areas of the work of the guild—education, membership, competitions and new music, conventions, young organists, and finance and development.

The regional councillors are elected by the members of the guild assigned to chapters within each of the seven regions. Regional councillors are responsible for supervision and coordination of the work of the guild in their regions and representation of the region on the National Council through the chair of the Board of Regional Councillors. The Board of Regional Councillors meets in person with the National Council once per year with voice, but no vote.

Appointed district conveners are responsible for the development of the guild's interests in each state or area located within the region. The district convener assists the regional councillor in the work of the region.

In addition to district conveners, regional coordinators are appointed to assist the regional councillor and a national councillor in coordinating work of a specific portfolio area of the guild within the region, such as education, regional competitions for young organists, and professional development.

In 2014, the formerly nine regions were consolidated into seven:
 
 Northeast
 Mid-Atlantic
 Southeast
 Great Lakes
 North Central
 Southwest
 West

Over the years, a number of international chapters have been formed and are grouped into the following AGO regions:
 Northeast: 
 Europe, Finland
 Southeast: 
 Barbados, Nairobi
 West:
 Hong Kong, Sydney (Australia), Shanghai, Singapore, Taiwan

These international chapters formally affiliate with the AGO rather than other professional associations that may already exist in their country, such as the Royal Canadian College of Organists or Royal College of Organists (UK).

Eileen Hunt is currently president, elected in 2022 to a two-year term to succeed Michael Bedford (2016–2022). Other past presidents serving in the 21st century, and their terms in office, include John Walker (organist) (2014–2016), Eileen Guenther (2008–2014) and Frederick Swann (2002–2008).

Programs and publications

The organization holds national conventions in even-numbered years and regional conventions in odd-numbered years. The 2010 national convention held in Washington, D.C., on July 4–8, for example, included workshops and concerts at prominent Washington-area churches, with premieres of newly commissioned works. The 2014 national convention, attended by more than 1,700 members, featured several notable venues in the Boston area, including Memorial Church of Harvard University and Trinity Church. The 2020 national convention planned for July in Atlanta, Georgia, was cancelled due to the COVID-19 pandemic.

The AGO sponsors a number of education programs, including "Pipe Organ Encounters", which are intended to introduce youth to the organ and its workings. It also produces a series of instructional DVDs for organists, providing insights into advanced playing technique, organ registration, improvisation, and interpretation. Renowned organists on these Master Series videos are: Catharine Crozier (vol. 1), Marie-Claire Alain (vol. 2), Frederick Swann (vol. 3), Gerre Hancock (vol. 4), and Marilyn Mason (vol. 5).

The AGO issues several professional certificates and designations upon completion of the appropriate exams and membership in good standing: the Service Playing Certificate (SPC), Colleague (CAGO), Choir Master (ChM), Associateship (AAGO), and Fellowship (FAGO), the highest level of certification bestowed upon accomplished organists by the organization's Board of Examiners.

The American Organist
Until November 1967, the journal The Diapason (published by Scranton-Gillette) was billed as the Official Journal of the American Guild of Organists, and the Official Magazine of the Royal Canadian College of Organists. In 1967, the AGO began publishing Music Magazine, a news journal for its membership. Now titled The American Organist, the monthly magazine is the official journal of the AGO for members and non-member subscribers. The illustrated periodical features news about new and restored pipe organs, concert programs, research into organ literature, chapter activities, and reviews of new organ recordings. The American Organist is also the official magazine for the Associated Pipe Organ Builders of America. Its masthead proclaims the journal's goal, to further the AGO's "ideals, objectives, and cultural and educational aspirations". From October, 1968, to June, 2009, The American Organist was also the official journal of the Royal Canadian College of Organists. The AGO also is an affiliate with the online journal Vox Humana.

Contests 
The AGO organizes several awards and competitions, including the Pogorzelski-Yankee Competition, the AGO/ECS Publishing Award in Choral Composition, and the AGO/Marilyn Mason Award in Organ Composition.

The AGO/Marilyn Mason Award has its roots in the Holtkamp Organ Composition Contest, which was inaugurated in 1978 by Walter Holtkamp (president of the Holtkamp Organ Company) and Donald Hinshaw (president of Hinshaw Music) to encourage composers under 30 years of age. The Holtkamp Organ Composition was held annually until 1984 in conjunction with the International Contemporary Organ Music Festival at the Hartt School of Music.  Winners of the Holtkamp Organ Composition Contest included:

 1978: Thomas Crawford and Frank Wiley, co-winners; Steven Errante and Paul Hofreiter, honorable mentions
 1979: Richard Campanelli, winner; Robert Sirota, honorable mention
 1980: Thomas Crawford and Blair Sanderson, co-winners; Frank Wiley, honorable mention
 1982: James Primosch

In 1984 the award was rebranded as the AGO/Holtkamp Award which awards a commission (and publication) for an organ work and a cash prize. It's held every two years in conjunction with AGO's national convention. In 2010 the award was rebranded as the AGO/Marilyn Mason Award to honor Marilyn Mason. Until 2016 the winning compositions were published by Hinshaw music; since then they have been published by H. T. FitzSimons. Winners include:

 1984: Ingrid Arauco for What Seraphs Are Afoot
 1986: Timothy Kramer for Perceptions of Antiquity
 1988: Martin Matalon for Variations for Organ and Percussion
 1990: Frank Ferko for A Practical Program
 1992: Ellen Ruth Harrison for That Line Which Is Earth's Shadow
 1994: Timothy Tikker for Variations SUr Un Vieux Noel
 1996: Robert Greenlee for Three Spirituals for Palm Sunday and Aaron Hunt for Fantasia and Fugue on St. Theodulph
 1998: Carlyle Sharpe for Confitemini Domino
 2000: David Arcus for Song of Ruth and Naomi
 2002: Emily Porter for What Wondrous Love Is This, O My Soul?
 2004: George Akerley for A Sweet for Mother Goose
 2006: Barrie Cabena for Six Sketches on Children's Hymns
 2008: Rachel Laurin for Prelude and Fugue in F Minor
 2010: Michael Bedford for Theme and Variations on Le P'ing
 2012: Nicholas O'Neill for Festive Voluntary
 2014: No prize awarded
 2016: Ivan Božičević for The Moonpiper
 2018: Mark Kurtz for Re-Formations (after Bach)
 2020: Joel Peters for Eine Wolke nahm ihm Weg
 2022: Rashaan Rori Allwood for In Memory Of...
 2024: Brooke Joyce for TBD

See also 
 Royal College of Organists (RCO), the older, British counterpart of the AGO

References

External links

Founders of the American Guild of Organists

1896 establishments in the United States
Guilds in the United States
Pipe organ organizations
Professional associations based in the United States